Beulah Heights University is a not for profit, private institution offering higher education in Atlanta, Georgia. The university was established in 1918 and is accredited to Association for Biblical Higher Education and Transnational Association of Christian Colleges and Schools. Formally, the university was affiliated with the Christian-Interdenominational religion. Beulah Heights is approved by the State of Georgia Nonpublic Postsecondary Education Commission for granting of Associate of Arts (AA), Bachelor of Arts (BA), Master of Arts (MA), Master of Business Administration (MBA), Master of Divinity (M.Div.), Doctor of Ministry (DMin), and Doctor of Philosophy (PhD) degrees.

References 

International universities
Universities and colleges in Atlanta
Transnational Association of Christian Colleges and Schools
Seminaries and theological colleges in Georgia (U.S. state)
Educational institutions established in 1918
1918 establishments in Georgia (U.S. state)